Christian Eminger (born October 21, 1964 in Baden, Switzerland) is a former ice speed skater from Austria. He represented Austria in three Winter Olympics, starting in 1984 in Sarajevo, Yugoslavia.

After his skating career, Eminger remained a competitive road bicycle rider. He is winner of the 2007 annual amateur ranking in Switzerland and two-times winner of the UCI Masters World Championship.

References
 SkateResults
 Homepage

1964 births
Living people
Austrian male speed skaters
Speed skaters at the 1984 Winter Olympics
Speed skaters at the 1988 Winter Olympics
Speed skaters at the 1994 Winter Olympics
Olympic speed skaters of Austria